Pouteria tenuisepala is a species of plant in the family Sapotaceae. It is found in Brazil and French Guiana.

References

tenuisepala
Least concern plants
Taxonomy articles created by Polbot
Taxa named by João Murça Pires